FSRU Independence, delivered in March 2014 is a LNG carrier designed as a floating LNG storage and regasification unit (FSRU) chartered by KN to be used as a LNG import terminal in Lithuania. The vessel can store  of natural gas and can supply all of Lithuania's need for natural gas. The vessel started operating in the autumn of 2014. It provides some diversification of Lithuanian gas imports away from Russia.

Built by Hyundai in South Korea, it arrived at Klaipėda on 27 October 2014, after a five-month cruise.

Current charterer KN has made a decision to purchase the FSRU from its owner Leif Höegh & Co no later than December 2024 which marks the end of 10-year term lease agreement executed between the parties.

External links
"At Anchor Off Lithuania, Its Own Energy Supply", article in The New York Times July 4, 2013
 "Gas terminal will serve to strengthen Lithuania's energy independence" , press release
"LITHUANIA FSRU", LITHUANIA FSRU, information from the shipowner Höegh
AFTER 2024 FSRU INDEPENDENCE WILL STAY IN LITHUANIA, press release

Floating liquefied natural gas terminals
2014 ships
Ships built by Hyundai Heavy Industries Group